CFRK-FM is a Canadian radio station broadcasting at 92.3 FM in Fredericton, New Brunswick owned by Stingray. The station airs a country format branded as New Country 92.3.

Based on the current format, CFRK competes with CKHJ who is predominantly an AM only station.

The station is the originating station for Weekend Country Heat, which is a Saturday evening program syndicated to most other Stingray country stations across Canada. Weekend Country Heat is hosted by John Riordon, who also hosts The Early Show on CFRK weekday mornings. Middays are anchored by the syndicated Paul McGuire Show, Shilo Bellis hosts afternoons, and The Casey Clarke show fills evening hours. The station remains as the only commercial signal in the market to feature live, local announcers seven days per week, with Izzy hosting Saturday and Sundays.

History
The station launched on July 28, 2005 under a classic rock/classic hits format branded as 92.3 Fred-FM with the first song being "Layla" by Derek & The Dominos. On March 1, 2013, at Noon, after playing "Free Bird" by Lynyrd Skynyrd, CFRK flipped to Top 40/CHR as Hot 92.3, whose logo and presentation was patterned after its sister station CIHT-FM in Ottawa. The first song played on "Hot" was "Scream & Shout" by will.i.am and Britney Spears.

On February 7, 2013, the CRTC approved Newcap's application to modify the technical parameters of the English language commercial radio programming undertaking CFRK-FM Fredericton by decreasing the station's average effective radiated power (ERP) from 93,000 to 42,000 watts (and by increasing the maximum ERP from 93,000 to 100,000 watts), by increasing the effective height of antenna above average terrain from 124.8 to 137.5 metres, by changing the radiation pattern of the antenna from non-directional to directional, and by relocating the antenna and transmitter from their current site at Hamtown Corner to Mount Hope.

On June 1, 2015, at Midnight, after playing "Amnesia" by Ilai Swindells, CFRK flipped to country, branded as New Country 92.3. The first song on "New Country" was "Sun Daze" by Florida Georgia Line. The lack of a local Country FM radio station prompted the format change.

Former logos

References

External links
New Country 92.3
 
 

Frk
Frk
Frk
Radio stations established in 2005
2005 establishments in New Brunswick